Hector Choquette (October 3, 1884 – May 8, 1959) was a Canadian politician and Member of the Legislative Assembly of Quebec (MLA).

Early life
He was born on October 3, 1884 near Granby, Estrie and became a farmer.

Member of the legislature
He ran as an Action libérale nationale candidate in the district of Shefford in the 1935 provincial election and won. Choquette joined Maurice Duplessis's Union Nationale and was re-elected in the 1936 election. He was defeated by Liberal candidate Charles Munson Bullock in the 1939 election.

Political comeback
Choquette was re-elected in the 1944 and 1948 elections. He lost his bid for re-election in the 1952 elections and was succeeded by Liberal candidate Gaston Ledoux.

Federal politics
Choquette unsuccessfully ran as a Progressive Conservative candidate in the federal district of Shefford in the 1957 federal election.

Death
He died on May 8, 1959 in Montreal.

References

1884 births
1959 deaths
Action libérale nationale MNAs
Union Nationale (Quebec) MNAs
Progressive Conservative Party of Canada candidates for the Canadian House of Commons
Candidates in the 1957 Canadian federal election